The 2010–11 Women's National Cricket League season was the 15th season of the Women's National Cricket League, the women's domestic limited overs cricket competition in Australia. The tournament started on 16 October 2010 and finished on 12 February 2011. The season saw the addition of Tasmanian Roar, taking the number of teams up to seven. Defending champions New South Wales Breakers won the tournament for the 13th time after topping the ladder at the conclusion of the round-robin phase and beating Victorian Spirit in the final.

Ladder

Fixtures

Round-robin phase

Final

Statistics

Highest totals

Most runs

Most wickets

References

External links
 Series home at ESPNcricinfo

 
Women's National Cricket League seasons
 
Women's National Cricket League